The razorbill, razor-billed auk, or lesser auk (Alca torda) is a colonial seabird and the only extant member of the genus Alca of the family Alcidae, the auks. It is the closest living relative of the extinct great auk (Pinguinis impennis). Wild populations live in the subarctic waters of the Atlantic Ocean.

Razorbills are primarily black with a white underside. The male and female are identical in plumage; however, males are generally larger than females. This agile bird, which is capable of both flight and diving, has a predominantly aquatic lifestyle and only comes to land in order to breed. It is monogamous, choosing one partner for life. Females lay one egg per year. Razorbills nest along coastal cliffs in enclosed or slightly exposed crevices. The parents spend equal amounts of time incubating, and once the chick has hatched, they take turns foraging for their young.

In 1918, the razorbill was protected in the United States by the Migratory Bird Treaty Act. Presently, this species faces major threats, including the destruction of breeding sites, oil spills, and deterioration of food quality. The IUCN records the population of the Gagarka as fluctuating, causing its status to interchange. It has been recorded that the population had increased from 2008 to 2015, decreased from 2015 to 2021, and appears to be increasing or stable at the present. It is believed the population of the Razorbill lies between 838,000 and 1,600,000 individuals.

Taxonomy 

The genus Alca was introduced in 1758 by the Swedish naturalist Carl Linnaeus in the tenth edition of his Systema Naturae. The genus name Alca is from Norwegian Alke, and torda is from törd a Gotland Swedish dialect word. Both terms refer to this species. The word Alca had been used by earlier authors for the razorbill such as Carolus Clusius in 1605 and Francis Willughby in 1676.

The razorbill (Alca torda) is now the sole species in the genus Alca. Its close relative, the great auk (Pinguinus impennis), became extinct in the mid-19th century. Razorbills and great auks are part of the tribe Alcini, which also includes the common murre or common guillemot (Uria aalge), the thick-billed murre (Uria lomvia), and the dovekie (Alle alle).

There are two subspecies of razorbill recognized by the American Ornithologists' Union. Alca torda torda, named by Linnaeus in 1758, occurs in the Baltic and White Seas, Norway, Bear Island, Iceland, Greenland, and eastern North America. Alca torda islandica, named by C.L. Brehm in 1831, occurs throughout Ireland, Great Britain, and northwestern France. The two subspecies differ slightly in bill measurements. A third subspecies, Alca torda pica, is no longer recognized because the distinguishing characteristic, an additional furrow in the upper mandible, is now known to be age-related.

Description

The razorbill has a white belly and a black head, neck, back, and feet during the breeding season. A thin white line also extends from the eyes to the end of the bill. Its head is darker than that of a common murre. During the non-breeding season, the throat and face behind the eye become white, and the white line on the face and bill becomes less prominent. The bill is black, deep and laterally compressed,  with a blunt end. It has several vertical grooves or furrows near the curved tip, one of them adorned with a white, broken vertical line. The bill is thinner and the grooves are less marked during the non-breeding season. The female and male adults are very much alike, having only small differences such as wing length. During incubation, this species has a horizontal stance and the tail feathers are slightly longer in the center in comparison to other alcids. This makes the razorbill have a distinctly long tail which is not common for an auk. In-flight, the feet do not protrude beyond the tail.

Their mating system is female-enforced monogamy; the razorbill pairs for life. It nests in open or hidden crevices among cliffs and boulders. It is a colonial breeder and only comes to land to breed. The annual survival rate of the razorbill is between 89 and 95%. Though the razorbill's average lifespan is roughly 13 years, a bird ringed in the UK in 1967 survived for at least 41 years—a record for the species.

Distribution and habitat 
Razorbills are distributed across the North Atlantic; the world population of razorbills is estimated to be at less than 1,000,000 breeding pairs, making them among the rarest auks in the world (Chapdelaine et al. 2001). Approximately half of the breeding pairs occur in Iceland. Razorbills thrive at water surface temperatures below 15 °C.  They are often seen with the two  larger auks, thick-billed murre and common murre.  However, unlike other auks, they commonly move into larger estuaries with lower salinity levels to feed.  These birds are distributed across sub-arctic and boreal waters of the Atlantic.  Their breeding habitat is islands, rocky shores, and cliffs on northern Atlantic coasts, in eastern North America as far south as Maine, and in western Europe from northwestern Russia to northern France.  North American birds migrate offshore and south, ranging from the Labrador Sea south to the Grand Banks of Newfoundland to New England.  Eurasian birds also winter at sea, with multiple populations aggregating in the North Sea and some moving south as far as the western Mediterranean. Approximately 60 to 70% of the entire razorbill population breeds in Iceland.

Razorbill colonies include (north to south):

 Grímsey, Iceland (66°33' N)
 Látrabjarg, Iceland (65°30' N) - 230,000 pairs, about 40% of the global population (mid-1990s estimate). Breeding season June – July.
 Runde, Norway (62°24' N) - 3,000 pairs
 St Kilda
 Staple Island, Outer Farne Islands, UK (55°38' N) - 20,000 pairs, breeding season May to mid-July.
 Bempton Cliffs, [Flamborough and Filey Coast Special Protection Area]United Kingdom (54°14’ N) - 20,000 pairs from March to mid-July.
 Skomer Island, Pembrokeshire, Wales
 Heligoland, Germany (54°10' N) - near the southern limit in Europe, a few pairs only
 Gannet Islands, Canada (53°58' N) - 9,800 pairs
 Funk Island, Canada (49°45' N)
 Baccalieu Island, Canada (48°07' N)
 Witless Bay, Canada (47°13' N)
 Cape St. Mary's, Canada (46°49' N)

Behaviour 

The life-history traits of the razorbill are similar to that of the common murre. However, razorbills are slightly more agile. 
It is a fully migratory and a naval bird, as during the colder months, it leaves land  and spends the entire winter in the waters of the Atlantic Ocean. 

During breeding, both males and females protect the nest. Females select their mate and will often encourage competition between males before choosing a partner. Once a male is chosen, the pair will stay together for life.

Reproduction 

Individuals only breed at 3–5 years of age. As pairs grow older they will occasionally skip a year of breeding. A mating pair will court several times during breeding periods to strengthen their bond. Courtship displays include touching bills and following one another in elaborate flight patterns. Once the pre-laying period begins, males will constantly guard their mates by knocking other males away with their bills. The pair will mate up to 80 times in a 30-day period to ensure fertilization. Females will sometimes encourage other males to engage in copulation to guarantee successful fecundity.

Throughout the pre-laying period, razorbills will socialize in large numbers. Two types of socializing occur: large groups dive and swim together in circles repeatedly and all rise up to the surface, heads first and bills open; secondly, large groups swim in a line weaving across each other in the same direction.

Nest sites 

Nest site choice is very important for these birds to ensure the protection of the young from predators. Nests are usually confined among the rocks or slightly more open. Some sites are along ledges, however, crevice sites seem to be more successful due to reduced predation.

The mating pair will often reuse the same site every year. Since chicks cannot fly, nests close to the sea provide easy access when leaving the colony. Generally, razorbills do not build a nest; however, some pairs often use their bills to drag material upon which to lay their egg. Nest under a boulder, rarely on an exposed ledge, may use Puffin or rabbit burrow. Although gregarious in breeding colonies, nests are not contiguous, but some meters apart, resulting in less aggression than in Guillemot colonies.

Incubation and hatching 

Females lay a single egg per year, usually from late April to May. The egg is an ovoid-pyramidal shape, cream color with has dark brown blotches. Incubation starts generally 48 hours after laying the egg. Females and males take turns incubating the egg several times daily for a total of approximately 35 days before hatching occurs. Razorbill chicks are semi-precocial. During the first two days after hatching, the chick will spend the majority of its time under the parent's wing. There is always one parent at the nest site while the other goes to sea to collect food for the chick. The hatchling develops a complete sheath 10 days after hatching. After 17–23 days, the chick leaves the nest by jumping from a cliff, closely followed by the male parent, who will accompany the chick to sea. During this time, the male parent will dive more than the female parent.

Feeding 

Razorbills dive deep into the sea using their semi-folded wings and their streamlined bodies to propel themselves toward their prey. They keep their feet spread. While diving, they rarely stay in groups but rather spread out to feed. During a single dive, an individual can capture and swallow many schooling fish, depending on their size. Razorbills spend approximately 44% of their time foraging at sea.

When feeding their young, they generally deliver small loads. Adults will mainly feed only one fish to their chick with high feeding deliveries at dawn and decreased feeding 4 hours before dark. Females will generally feed their chicks more frequently than males.

Diet 

The diet of razorbill is very similar to that of a common murre or common guillemot. It consists generally of mid-water schooling fish such as capelin, sand lance, juvenile cod, sprats, and herring. It may also include crustaceans and polychaetes. A recent study suggests the razorbill's diet is affected by local and regional environmental conditions in the marine environment

Predators 

The adult razorbill has several predators which include: polar bears, great black-backed gulls, peregrine falcons, ravens, crows, and jackdaws. The general predators of their eggs are gulls and ravens. The best chance for adult razorbill to avoid predation is by diving. Arctic foxes can also predate significant numbers of adults, eggs, and chicks in some years.

Razorbill eggs were collected until the late 1920s in Scotland's remote St Kilda islands by their men scaling the cliffs. The eggs were buried in St Kilda peat ash to be eaten through the cold, northern winters. The eggs were considered to taste like duck eggs in taste and nourishment.

Conservation and management 

In the early 20th century, razorbills were harvested for eggs, meat, and feathers. This greatly decreased the global population. In 1917, they were finally protected by the “Migratory Bird Treaty Act” which reduced hunting. Other threatening interactions include oil pollution which can damage breeding sites. Any damage to breeding sites can reduce possible nest sites and affect the reproduction of the species. Commercial fishing affects populations because razorbills can become tangled in nets. Overfishing also decreases the abundance of razorbill prey and thus affects their survival.

Evolution and prehistoric species 
While the razorbill is the only living species, the genus Alca had a much higher diversity in the Pliocene. Some ornithologists also feel it is appropriate to retain the great auk in the genus Alca, instead of Pinguinus. A number of fossil forms have been found:

 Alca "antiqua" (Late Miocene/Early Pliocene of Lee Creek Mine, US)
 Alca sp. (Late Miocene/Early Pliocene of Lee Creek Mine, US) - possibly A. stewarti
 Alca stewarti (Kattendijk Sands Early Pliocene of Belgium)
 Alca ausonia (Yorktown Early Pliocene of Lee Creek Mine, US - Middle Pliocene of Italy)
 Alca sp. (Puerto de Mazarrón Pliocene of El Alamillo, Spain) - may be A. antiqua or A. ausonia

As far as is known, the genus Alca seems to have evolved in the western North Atlantic or the present-day Caribbean like most other Alcini. Its ancestors would have reached these waters through the still-open Isthmus of Panama during the Miocene.

References

External links 

 
 
 
 

Alcini
Atlantic auks
Birds of Europe
Birds of Greenland
Birds of Iceland
Birds of Scandinavia
Birds described in 1758
Taxa named by Carl Linnaeus